Paul Denis Gregory Hooper  (born 26 April 1952, in Winchester) was Archdeacon of Leeds from 2012 until 30 October 2016.

Hooper was educated at Eastbourne College, the University of Manchester and Wycliffe Hall, Oxford. He was ordained in 1982. 
His posts up to 2012 were
 1982-84: Curate St George, Leeds
 1984-87: Diocese of Ripon Youth Officer
 1987-95: Bishop's Domestic Chaplain, Diocese of Ripon
 1995-2009: Vicar St Mark, Harrogate
 2005-2009:Area Dean Harrogate
 2009-12: Director Clergy Development, Diocese of Ripon and Leeds

References

1952 births
Clergy from Winchester
Living people
People educated at Eastbourne College
Alumni of the University of Manchester
Alumni of Wycliffe Hall, Oxford
Archdeacons of Leeds